The 2012 Hi Tech Oils Australian Swift Series is the third running of the series in Australia. It will be based around eight rounds in four different states, featuring for the second year the Suzuki Swift Sport RS416 model.

Round 1 at Sydney's Eastern Creek Grand Prix Circuit saw Queenslander and reigning champion Allan Jarvis take pole position and win all three races. Second for the weekend was Country Music singer Adam Brand with rookie Reece Murphy third.

Round 2 was held at Mallala Motor Sport Park in South Australia the week after Easter. Current Champion Allan Jarvis won race 1 with newcomer Reece Murphy winning races 2 and 3 and also took the round victory. Second for the weekend was Rob Jarvis with his son Allan Jarvis third.

In between Mallala and Winton, a Non-Championship round was held at Queensland's Lakeside Raceway. Championship leader Allan Jarvis won the weekend with newcomers Dale Corbett second and Brandon Porch third.

Round 3 held at Winton Raceway proved a difficult weekend for drivers with Friday and Saturday being dry and race day Sunday wet. Series regular Reece Murphy clawed his way back into contention for the title with a consistent drive to finish second for the round behind newcomer Damian Ward. Third went to veteran Rob Jarvis with his son Allan finishing fifth and holds onto the championship lead by only two points.

Round 4 rolled into Sydney Motorsport Park in New South Wales under sunny skies. Brooke Leech withdrew after a breaking her knee in a karting accident and Perth's Brett Stewart also after competing in Townsville the week before. Former V8 Supercar driver Richard Mork rejoined the series as did Production Car veteran Brendon Cook. Series regular Reece Murphy had his way for most of the weekend with two wins and a second place pushing him to the lead of the championship. Defending champion Allan Jarvis was second with Adam Brand third.

Round 5 moved to Queensland Raceway in August for the first time. Defending series champion Allan Jarvis hit back with a win by one point over Round 4 winner Reece Murphy. Damian Ward rounded out the podium. Brooke Leech returned to the series after recovering from her karting accident.

Round 6 moved to New South Wales' Wakefield Park, a short drive from the nation's capital of Canberra. Damian Ward won the weekend with two race wins from Reece Murphy and current champion Allan Jarvis. The final round will be held at Sandown, Victoria.

Calendar
The 2012 Australian Swift Series will be contested over eight rounds, starting at Eastern Creek in March and finishing at Sandown in November.

Driver standings

Points system
Points are awarded to the driver or drivers of a car that start any race.

References

External links
 Official Web Page
 Shannons Nationals Web Page
 Final pointscore

Suzuki Swift Series